Jan Harte van Tecklenburg  or Joannes Josephus Ignatius Harte (15 October 1853 – 4 July 1937) was a Dutch politician.

Van Tecklenburg was born in Utrecht. He was a staunch Roman Catholic and was initially a member of the conservative wing of the Catholic party.  He acquired wealth by marrying the daughter of a wealthy margarine manufacturer, Anton Jurgens. With that help he was elected to the  Dutch House of Representatives from the Grave district.  In parliament he became a follower of Herman Schaepman who was concerned with reforms particularly in the area of social services.  He served as his party's treasurer, and in 1901 he became the Minister of Finance in the ARP's Kuyper cabinet. However the only significant legislation that he proposed was a protectionist Tariff Act, and that came so late in his tenure, that it died when the government lost the election on 19 August 1905.

See also
List of Dutch politicians

References

1853 births
1937 deaths
Ministers of Finance of the Netherlands
Politicians from Utrecht (city)
Dutch Roman Catholics